Glenn David Williams (born 18 July 1977) is a retired third baseman from Australia, who played in the Minnesota Twins organization. He played in Major League Baseball for the Twins during the  season. He was a member of the team that won the silver medal at the 2004 Summer Olympics in Athens, Greece. Williams had a 13-game career hitting streak, as he had a hit in every game that he played in while in the major leagues.

Glenn is the elder of two children. His father Gary Williams has been heavily involved in the development of baseball in Australia. Both Gary and Glenn Williams have represented their native Australia in international baseball competitions.

In 1993, as a 16-year-old, Glenn signed a lucrative free agent contract with the Atlanta Braves for an estimated 1.3 million Australian dollars. Since that time, Glenn has played baseball for the minor league affiliates of the Atlanta Braves, Toronto Blue Jays, and Minnesota Twins.

After spending over 10 years in the minor leagues, Glenn made his major league debut with the Minnesota Twins during the 2005 season. In 2007, Glenn played for the Minnesota Twins Triple-A affiliate team, the Rochester Red Wings.

On 19 August 2010 Glenn was announced as manager for the Australian Baseball League foundation club Sydney Blue Sox in their inaugural 2010–11 season.

On 09 April 2021, Baseball Australia has announced Glenn as the new chief executive officer after former CEO Cam Vale steps down.

References

External links

 

1977 births
2006 World Baseball Classic players
Australian expatriate baseball players in the United States
Baseball players at the 2000 Summer Olympics
Baseball players at the 2004 Summer Olympics
Living people
Major League Baseball players from Australia
Major League Baseball third basemen
Medalists at the 2004 Summer Olympics
Minnesota Twins players
Olympic baseball players of Australia
Olympic silver medalists for Australia
Olympic medalists in baseball
Danville 97s players
Danville Braves players
Dunedin Blue Jays players
Eugene Emeralds players
Gulf Coast Braves players
Greenville Braves players
Macon Braves players
Rochester Red Wings players
Syracuse SkyChiefs players
Tennessee Smokies players
Sportsmen from New South Wales